The Chordettes Sing Your Requests is an album recorded by The Chordettes and released in 1954 by Columbia Records as catalog number CL-6285.

Track listing
"Wait Till the Sun Shines, Nellie" (Andrew B. Sterling/Harry Von Tilzer)
"They Say It's Wonderful" (Irving Berlin)
"I Wonder Who's Kissing Her Now" (Frank R. Adams/Will M. Hough/Harold Orlob/Joseph E. Howard)
"For Me and My Gal" (Edgar Leslie/Ray E. Goetz/George W. Meyer)
"I Believe" (Irving Graham/Al Stillman/Jimmy Shirl/Ervin Drake)
"Down among the Sheltering Palms" (James Brockman/Abe Olman)
"Hello! Ma Baby" (Ida Emerson/Joseph E. Howard/Louis C. Singer)
"Wonderful One" (Ferde Grofé/Paul Whiteman/Theodora Morse)
"(When It's) Darkness in the Delta" (Jerry Livingston/Al J. Neiburg/Marty Symes)

This album was reissued, together with Harmony Encores, as a compact disk in 2002.

1954 albums
Columbia Records albums
The Chordettes albums
Albums produced by Archie Bleyer